The men's freestyle 86 kilograms is a competition featured at the 2017 World Wrestling Championships, and was held in Paris, France on 25 August 2017.

Results

Finals

Top half

Section 1

Section 2

Bottom half

Section 3

Section 4

Repechage

References

External links
Official website

Men's freestyle 86 kg